Ari Jósefsson (28 August 1939 – 18 June 1964) was an Icelandic poet. He was a student of romance studies in Barcelona and Bucharest and published only one book of poetry during his lifetime. When he was on his way home to Reykjavík after completing his Romanian language studies in Bucharest, Jósefsson tragically fell overboard from the ship Gullfoss and drowned on June 18, 1964.

Works 

Nei (1961)

See also 

 List of Icelandic writers
 Culture of Iceland

Icelandic male poets
1939 births
1964 deaths
Deaths by drowning
Accidental deaths in Iceland
20th-century Icelandic poets
20th-century male writers